Next is a dating game show produced by Kallissa Miller with her production company Kallissa Productions, which ran on MTV from 2005 to 2008.

Format
Next dealt with a contestant going on sequential blind dates with possibly up to five other single people, known as "the daters", who were secluded on a RV, referred to as the "Next Bus". The added twist was that the date could end at any time by the contestant shouting "next".

Each episode featured two segments, featuring a single man or woman as the prime contestant, and five other single men or women as the daters. The segment began with the prime contestant describing themselves to the audience. They would usually explain a hobby that they enjoy and what they like and dislike in a person, often chiding that they would "next" a person if they had this attribute.

Then, the five daters described themselves to the audience.

The five daters were secluded in the "Next Bus" (which was always in a very short walking distance from the date location), and the contestant was at a location where the date will be held. (Most typically in an outdoor urban setting, which generally throughout the segment took place in that area alone, but in some cases date locations were at multiple diverse locations sometimes.) In a preselected fashion, the five daters were put into an order to go on a date with the contestant.

When a dater leaves the bus for their date, as they are exiting out of the RV door, the screen pauses momentarily and personal facts are captioned on the screen. The dater then exits and introduces themselves to the contestant. The date begins at this exact moment, and a timer is shown at the bottom of the screen, (which captures the length of the date). The date usually varied, but most of the time, it consisted of a challenge or an activity that the contestant asked the dater to participate in. However, it wasn't uncommon for a date to feature the two people conversing or eating a meal as well or in addition to that.

Unlike most dating shows to where usually a contestant goes on a date with someone then afterwards decides what happens after, the contestant in Next is in full control to how long, or even if a dater is on the date.

A date is concluded only by two methods. Either a dater is "nexted" by the contestant, (in which if this person were one of the first four of the five daters, the segment continues and another dater would then immediately leave the RV to date the contestant; if not, the segment would immediately be over;) or the dater is offered a proposition from the contestant to go on another date/continue relations outside the program, or to essentially "next" themselves and reject the contestant. (This can only be done once, and once only to one dater, and the segment is over shortly after this.)

In the sense of a date ending from being "nexted":

If at any time (which could be within seconds or even hours) during the date in which the contestant feels that the dater isn't a match, (which a contestant can next a dater for warranted or unwarranted reasons; usually it's whether it is from lack of attraction, a bad first impression, a problem that happens during the date, not participating in a task or activity, or learning more about the dater's personal life as the date goes along) he or she would be rejected for the rest of the program by the contestant and exclaim "next," and the date would immediately end.  (If the contestant was riding in a vehicle which would caravan the secluded daters on the RV to a date location, the vehicle will immediately pull over, and the dater would get out of the vehicle and get on the RV which would be in front of or behind the vehicle.)

When the date ends, the timer immediately stops and morphs into a dollar amount. The daters on the RV who were "nexted", will receive $1 for every minute the date lasted (indicated from the timer on the bottom of the screen). If a dater was "nexted" before one minute, they received one dollar.

The dater would be sent back to the RV. Once back in the RV, the dater would usually say either a positive or negative thing about the person to give the remaining daters an idea about the contestant.

(If the dater was one of the first four in the order, the next dater in the lineup would exit the RV and begin a date with the contestant, following the same identical format. If this were the last dater in the order, the segment ends as all five daters have been "nexted')

On select occasions, a dater for apparent or for no apparent reasons would ask to end the date and/or hint for themselves to be "nexted", despite the fact the contestant did not want to. So in essence, the contestant who by the rules of the show is the only person allowed to end a date, this is a way for a dater to circumvent, and end the date themselves. This in turn would most likely have the contestant "next" the person due to this.

In the sense of a date ending from a dater being propositioned from a contestant for a second date:

During the date, if a contestant felt that they had an extreme connection/chemistry to an RV dater, the timer would stop and be morphed into a dollar amount (which would correlate to a dollar for every minute the date lasted. If the date was less than a minute, it would be one dollar) and the date would officially end, but not with the dater being "nexted".

The contestant would then say, "You have been on a date with me for ("X" number of minutes). You can either take the ("X"amount of money) and run, or go on a second date."

The screen would then pause on the dater and a review of their date would play, including flashbacks of positive and negative aspects of the date. Also, comments from daters on the RV about the contestant would air. At this point, the dater would opt to either take the money (similar to as if they were "nexted"), or forfeit that money and go on a second date with contestant.

The tables would then essentially turn, and a dater would have the chance to either reject a contestant, or exchange the same feelings the contestant had.

If the dater decides to reject the contestant for any reason, they take the money they earned from the date, and he or she will go back to the RV just as if they were "nexted" and tell the daters what happened. The contestant would then be left alone by themselves. On the other hand, if the dater chose to go on a second date, the dater would forfeit the money they earned from the date, and dater would walk away together with the contestant, and the remaining daters on the RV would usually say rude or impolite things to the contestant and/or the dater. The segment then shortly ends after either scenario.

The contestant can ask any dater for a second date. They can be the first or the last. The contestant can also do this at any time during the date, whether it's within seconds of meeting the person, or hours into the date.

However, the contestant is only allowed to select one person out of the five to proposition a second date to, (regardless if the dater accepted or rejected their offer for a second date) and after doing this, they are not allowed to meet the remaining daters on the RV (if any).

If the dater offered a second date by the contestant was not the final person in the dating order, the remaining dater(s) never get to meet the contestant or go on a date with him or her.

A segment would usually end with the contestant giving a proposition to a dater to go on a second date, but the segment could also essentially end if the person "nexted" all five contestants.

International versions

 The Spanish version, aired on Neox of Antena 3 in 2010.
 The French version aired in 2008 on Virgin 17 and MTV.
 The Lithuania show debuted in 2007 on LNK.
 The Chilean show debuted on September 22, 2008 and airs on MEGA.
 The Canadian series began around 2009 on Much Music.
 The Bulgarian series began around 2014 on TV7.

References

External links
 
 NextOrNot.com

MTV game shows
MTV weekday shows
American dating and relationship reality television series
2005 American television series debuts
2008 American television series endings
2000s American reality television series
2000s American game shows
Television game shows with incorrect disambiguation